The South Side Area School District is a small, rural, public school district in Beaver County, Pennsylvania. It serves the boroughs of Shippingport, Hookstown, Frankfort Springs, and Georgetown, and the township of Greene Township and Hanover Township. According to 2000 federal census data, it serves a resident population of 6,935 people. In 2009, the district residents’ per capita income was $17,378, while the median family income was $49,030. In the Commonwealth, the median family income was $49,501 and the United States median family income was $49,445, in 2010.

South Side Area School District operates three schools: South Side High School (9th-12th), South Side Middle School (6th-8th), South Side Elementary School (K-5th).

References

School districts in Beaver County, Pennsylvania